Garlin Murl Conner (June 2, 1919 – November 5, 1998) was a United States Army technical sergeant and first lieutenant in the Second World War. He was awarded the Distinguished Service Cross, four Silver Stars, and the French Croix de guerre for his heroic actions in Italy and France during the war. During his campaigns, he was wounded three times. An attempt to upgrade Conner's Distinguished Service Cross to the Medal of Honor, the United States military's highest decoration for valor, took 22 years. On 29 March 2018, the White House announced President Trump would award the Medal of Honor to Garlin Murl Conner in a ceremony at the White House. On 26 June 2018, the president presented the medal to Pauline Conner, his widow, in a ceremony in the East Room.

Early life
Conner was born on 2 June 1919 in Aaron, Kentucky. He was the third child of eleven brothers and sisters. He and four of his brothers served during World War II.

Military service
Conner, who was generally known by his middle name, which he originally spelled "Merle," was a selectee for the military and entered the U.S. Army on 1 March 1941 in Louisville, Kentucky. He completed his basic training at Fort Lewis, Washington where he became a member of K Company, 3rd Battalion, 7th Infantry Regiment, 3rd Infantry Division. After training with his division at Fort Lewis, he was sent with the 3rd Infantry Division to Camp Ord, California and Fort Pickett, Virginia for further combat training.

On 23 October 1942, Conner and his division departed the United States from Norfolk, Virginia, to fight in the European-African-Middle Eastern theater of operations arriving on 8 November for the invasion of French North Africa. He participated in four amphibious assault landings and eight campaigns including the Anzio Campaign in Italy during which he earned his second Silver Star (Bronze Oak Leaf Cluster). He was promoted to technical sergeant on 13 January 1944. He was discharged on 27 June 1944, and commissioned a second lieutenant on 28 June 1944. On 29 December 1944, he was promoted to first lieutenant.

Conner was awarded four Silver Stars for gallantry in action: in October 1943, 30 January 1944, 11 September 1944, and 3 February 1945. He was also awarded the Bronze Star Medal, and three Purple Hearts for being wounded in action on 6 March 1944, in August, and in September 1944. He was presented the Distinguished Service Cross from Lieutenant General Alexander Patch, the Commander of the Seventh Army, for extraordinary heroism during a German counterattack with six tanks and 600 infantrymen on 24 January 1945, near Houssen, France. Recently returned to his unit from the hospital, intelligence staff officer Lt. Conner volunteered to go forward to direct artillery fire against the German counterattack. The enemy got so close that Lt. Conner had to call artillery fire directly on his own position, leading to the death of more than 50 Germans and stopping the assault.

In March 1945, Conner was sent back to the U.S. and was honorably discharged on 22 June 1945. He was honored in an event in Albany, Kentucky in May 1945, at which Alvin C. York of nearby Pall Mall, Tennessee, the most noted Medal of Honor winner of World War I, was a speaker.

Post-military and death
Conner married Lyda Pauline Wells on 9 July 1945.

After the war, the Conners lived on Indian Creek several miles north of Albany, near the Cumberland River, in a home with no electricity or running water, on a farm worked with mules and horses. In 1950 the U.S. government bought their property for the impoundment of Lake Cumberland and they moved to the Rolan community in southeastern Clinton County, Kentucky. They had one son, Paul, one grandson, and three granddaughters. Conner continued farming and was president of the Clinton County Farm Bureau for 17 years. He was active in various veterans organizations including the Paralyzed Veterans of America and the Disabled American Veterans, and traveled to many nearby counties to assist veterans and their dependents with claims for benefits due them as a result of military service. He was handicapped from his war wounds, heart disease and Parkinson's Disease.

Conner died in 1998, and was buried in Memorial Hills in Albany. In 2012, the U.S. Army honored him by designating a portion of a new maintenance facility at Fort Benning, Georgia as Conner Hall.

Military awards
Conner's military decorations and awards:

   French Fourragère  (Unit award)

Distinguished Service Cross citation

Conner's Distinguished Service Cross reads:

Name: First Lieutenant Garlin M. Conner
Unit: Headquarters Company, 3rd Battalion, 7th Infantry Regiment, 3rd Infantry Division
Place and date: Near Houssen, France, 24 January 1945
G.O. No.: 47, 10 February 1945

Citation:

 For extraordinary heroism in action.  On 24 January 1945, at 0800 hours, near Houssen, France, Lieutenant Conner ran four hundred yards through the impact area of an intense concentration of enemy artillery fire to direct friendly artillery on a force of six Mark VI tanks and tank destroyers, followed by six hundred fanatical German infantrymen, which was assaulting in full fury the spearhead position held by his Battalion.  Unreeling a spool of telephone wire, Lieutenant Conner disregarded shells which exploded twenty-five yards from him, tearing branches from the trees in his path, and plunged in a shallow ditch thirty yards beyond the position of his foremost company.  Although the ditch provided inadequate protection from the heavy automatic fire of the advancing enemy infantry, he calmly directed round after round of artillery on the foe from his prone position, hurling them back to the shelter of a dike.  For three hours he remained at his OP [observation post] despite wave after wave of German infantry, which surged forward to within five yards of his position.  As the last, all-out German assault swept forward, he ordered his artillery to concentrate on his own position, resolved to die if necessary to halt the enemy.  Friendly shells exploded within five yards of him, blanketing his position, wounding his one assistant.  Yet Lieutenant Conner continued to direct artillery fire on the assault elements swarming around him until the German attack was shattered and broken.  By his exemplary heroism, he killed approximately fifty and wounded an estimated one hundred Germans, disintegrated the powerful enemy assault and prevented heavy casualties in his Battalion.  Entered military service from Aaron, Kentucky.

 By command of Lieutenant General Patch

Medal of Honor campaign

Since 1996, there have been continuous efforts to have Conner's Distinguished Service Cross upgraded to the Medal of Honor. The numerous requests for the change of award required Army approval and were denied by the Army up until 22 October 2015.  Included in these requests was a comparison of Conner's actions on 24 January 1945 to Audie Murphy's Medal of Honor actions two days later. Murphy, one of the most decorated soldiers of World War II, also served in the 3rd Infantry Division. In a letter from the Audie Murphy family (written by spokesperson Coy Prather) to Walton R. Haddix on June 26, 2018, it was explained that comparisons to Audie Murphy and the mention of his name were not acceptable to the Murphy family. "Audie wasn't into measuring valor, comparing feats of bravery or medal counting".  It was also explained Audie Murphy would not understand going to Federal Court to try to be awarded the Medal of Honor. It was requested at that time that the Conner family and his associates discontinue mentioning Audie Murphy in any connection with Garlin Murl Conner.

Through the pictures, medals, and testimony of Conner's superior officers, including Maj. Gen. Lloyd B. Ramsey, the story of Conner's heroic actions more than 50 years earlier in France came back to life. Early on 24 January 1945, Conner's commanding officer was seeking a volunteer for a dangerous and life-threatening mission: Run 400 yards directly toward the enemy while unreeling telephone wire all the way to trenches on the front line. From that point, the volunteer would be able to call in targeting coordinates for mortar fire. Conner and another soldier with him, grabbed the spool of wire and took off amid intense enemy fire. They made it to the ditch, where Conner stayed in contact with his unit for three hours in near-zero-degree weather as a ferocious onslaught of German tanks and infantry bore down on him.

Korean War veteran Richard Chilton, whose uncle Pfc. Gordon W. Roberts served with Conner in combat and was killed in action at Anzio on 31 January 1944, stated in 2015, "My God, he held off 600 Germans and six tanks coming right at him. When they got too close, his commander told him to vacate and instead, he says, 'Blanket my position.'" The request meant Conner was calling for artillery strikes as he was being overrun, risking his life in order to draw friendly fire that would take out the enemy, too,  during which time he directed his men for three hours by telephone. During the action, Conner killed 50 German soldiers with artillery fire and his companion was wounded. Lt. Harold Wigetman a member of the 3rd Battalion, 7th Infantry, credited Conner with saving the battalion.

Pauline Conner with the help of Chilton and others, waged a seventeen-year campaign for the Medal of Honor recognition for Garlin, for the 24 January 1945 action. On 11 March 2014, U.S. District Judge Thomas B. Russell ruled that Pauline had waited too long to submit her most recent request.

In late October 2015, the 6th Circuit Court of Appeals ordered the parties into mediation. The Army's Board for Correction of Military Records recommended Connor for the Medal of Honor.

The National Defense Authorization Act for Fiscal Year 2018 which was signed into law by the President on 12 December 2017, includes in an amendment, the "Authorization For Award Of The Medal Of Honor To Garlin M. Conner For Acts of Valor During World War II", that waives the time limit to award the Medal of Honor to Conner for which he was previously awarded the Distinguished Service Cross for extraordinary heroism on 24 January 1945 in France.

On 29 March 2018, The White House announced that President Trump would present the Medal of Honor posthumously to Conner; the presentation took place on 26 June 2018.

Medal of Honor citation

Notes

References

External links

Congressional Record quoting Kentucky joint resolution

Military.com 13 Apr 2018 article

1919 births
1998 deaths
United States Army personnel of World War II
People from Albany, Kentucky
Farmers from Kentucky
Military personnel from Kentucky
Recipients of the Croix de Guerre (France)
Recipients of the Distinguished Service Cross (United States)
Recipients of the Silver Star
United States Army officers
United States Army Medal of Honor recipients